The fifth season of Gilmore Girls, an American dramedy television series, began airing on September 21, 2004, on The WB. The season concluded on May 17, 2005, after 22 episodes. The season aired Tuesday nights at 8/7c.

On May 17, 2005, The WB announced that the show was renewed for a sixth season.

Overview
The season picks up at the exact point the previous season ended, with Lorelai embarking on a relationship with Luke and Rory beginning an affair with married Dean. Having finally admitted they are separated, Richard and Emily formalise things by having Richard move into the pool house, with the girls splitting Friday nights between the two of them. Dean's marriage to Lindsay comes to an abrupt end when she finds a letter Rory wrote to him about their night together. He and Rory try dating again but have difficulty spending time together and quickly split for good.

Christopher reveals that Sherry has left him to look after Georgia alone and asks Lorelai for help. Rory asks him to keep his distance but relents when his father dies suddenly. Both Richard and Emily are uncomfortable with Lorelai and Luke's relationship, with Richard trying to get Luke to franchise his diner. They reconcile and renew their vows with Rory as best man and Lorelai as maid of honour. Emily invites Christopher and encourages him to pursue Lorelai, resulting in Luke and Lorelai splitting for a time and both Lorelai and Rory falling out with Emily, although Rory continues to attend Friday night dinners alone as part of their deal.

Lane is shocked to realise she has feelings for Zach and they start dating, but she surprises them both by revealing she wants to wait for marriage before having sex. Paris returns from Oxford and reveals Asher has died of a heart attack, but is soon dating Doyle. Sookie becomes pregnant again and has a daughter, before ordering Jackson to have a vasectomy. Jackson stands against Taylor as town selectman and is elected but is soon overwhelmed with work. Michel wins a camper van on The Price Is Right but soon sells it. Kirk decides to move out of his mother's place to spend more time with Lulu but forgets to find somewhere to move to so ends up finding various places to stay. When Old Man Twickham dies, his house is initially set up as a town museum before being sold. Kirk and Luke compete to buy it but the town elders decide Luke wants it more after he describes it as his dream house.

Despite romantic overtures from Marty, Rory is drawn to Logan Huntzberger, a rich playboy who introduces her to a hedonistic thrill-seeking lifestyle. They initially have a casual relationship but when Rory decides it isn't for her, he agrees to a committed relationship. He takes her home where his mother and grandfather make it clear they don't think she's good enough to marry him. His father Mitchum gives her an internship at one of his papers but tells her he doesn't think she has what it takes. Upset, she convinces Logan to steal a yacht to take her out on the sea.

In the season finale, Rory has been charged for the yacht theft and announces she is dropping out of Yale. Lorelai refuses to let her come home so Richard and Emily let her move into the pool house and get a job, hoping she will change her mind. Luke tells Taylor he's pulling out of the house purchase when he discovers Lorelai is considering selling the inn, while Lane's mother arranges for her and the band to tour church theatres. The season ends with Lorelai asking Luke to marry her.

Cast

Main cast
 Lauren Graham as Lorelai Gilmore, Rory's mother.
 Alexis Bledel as Rory Gilmore, Lorelai's daughter.
 Melissa McCarthy as Sookie St. James, Lorelai's best friend and co-worker.
 Scott Patterson as Luke Danes, the owner of the local diner and Lorelai's boyfriend.
 Keiko Agena as Lane Kim, Rory's best friend.
 Yanic Truesdale as Michel Gerard, Lorelai and Sookie's co-worker.
 Liza Weil as Paris Geller, Rory's roommate and close friend.
 Sean Gunn as Kirk Gleason, a resident of Stars Hollow who works many jobs.
 Kelly Bishop as Emily Gilmore, Lorelai's mother and Rory's grandmother.
 Edward Herrmann as Richard Gilmore, Lorelai's father and Rory's grandfather.

Recurring cast
 Jackson Douglas as Jackson Belleville, Sookie's husband.
 Matt Czuchry as Logan Huntzberger, Rory's boyfriend.
 Liz Torres as Miss Patty, the owner of the local dance studio.
 Emily Kuroda as Mrs. Kim, Lane's religious mother.
 Sally Struthers as Babette Dell, Lorelai and Rory's next door neighbor.
 Ted Rooney as Morey Dell, Lorelai and Rory's next door neighbor.
 Michael Winters as Taylor Doose, the owner of the local grocery store.
 Jared Padalecki as Dean Forester, Rory's ex-boyfriend.
 David Sutcliffe as Christopher Hayden, Rory's father and Lorelai's ex-boyfriend.
 Todd Lowe as Zach Van Gerbig, Lane's bandmate and boyfriend.
 John Cabrera as Brian Fuller, Lane's bandmate.
 Sebastian Bach as Gil, Lane's bandmate.
 Danny Strong as Doyle McMaster, the editor of the Yale Daily News and Paris's boyfriend.
 Wayne Wilcox as Marty, Rory's classmate and good friend.
 Kathleen Wilhoite as Liz Danes, Luke's younger sister.
 Michael DeLuise as TJ, Liz's husband.
 Gregg Henry as Mitchum Huntzberger, Logan's father.
 Scout Taylor Compton as Clara Forester, Dean's sister.
 Devon Sorvari as Honor Huntzberger, Logan's sister.
 Arielle Kebbel as Lindsay Lister Forester, Dean's ex-wife.

Episodes

DVD release

References

Season
2004 American television seasons
2005 American television seasons